Tomten, also known as "Midvinternattens köld är hård", is a poem written by Viktor Rydberg, and originally published in Ny Illustrerad Tidning in 1881. While outwardly being an idyllic Christmas poem, the poem asks about the meaning of life.

A short film, Tomten, was recorded in 1941 by Gösta Roosling, where Hilda Borgström reads the entire poem.

Lotta Engberg's 2009 Christmas album Jul hos mig closes with a final, hidden, bonus track with Sven Wollter reading the poem.

The poem has also been recorded as an audio book, with Torgny Lindgren reading it.

In English
Rydberg's poem has been translated into English by Charles Wharton Stork, Anna Krook, Elias Gordon and Judith Moffett. In 1961 Astrid Lindgren published a prose version of the story with illustrations by Harald Wiberg. In 2007 the German film Tomte Tummetott and the Fox was made, based on the stories by Astrid Lindgren.

Set to music 
 Julens önskesångbok, 1997, under the lines "Traditionella julsånger", with music by Lyyli Wartiovaara-Kallioniemi.

See also
 List of Christmas-themed literature

References

External links
Tomten: Swedish lyrics
Tomten: English translation
Anthology of Swedish Lyrics from 1750 to 1915 at the Internet Archive

Christmas poems
1881 poems
Works by Viktor Rydberg